Cowansville is a town in south-central Quebec, Canada, located on Lac Davignon  north of the U.S. border. It is the seat of Brome-Missisquoi, a regional county municipality. The population as of the Canada 2021 Census was 15,234.

In recent years, Cowansville has seen its commercial activity blossom mainly due to its proximity to a major freeway, Autoroute 10, and the Eastern Townships ski resort region.

History and name

Jacob Ruiter was the first person to settle on the current site of Cowansville.  In 1800 he built a flour mill, and then a saw mill.  In 1805, Ruiter named the small town as Nelsonville, in honour of British admiral, Lord Horatio Nelson, who was killed in the naval Battle of Trafalgar.

The city's current name is due to Peter Cowan, a merchant from Montreal who settled in the area in 1836 and become postmaster in 1841.  In order to avoid the mail being sent inadvertently to another city named Nelsonville, close to Hamilton in Upper Canada, he decided to change its name.
 
During the 1870s, the construction of the South Eastern Railway linking Montreal to Cowansville and the opening of the first bank, the Eastern Townships Bank, contributed to the expansion of the small city, which allows many businesses settle in the area. The municipality detached from the district of Dunham, and incorporated on the January 1, 1876 and officially was named Cowansville. In February of the same year James O'Halloran was acclaimed as Mayor by the town council. Cowansville saw a strong industrial growth during the 20th century, and became a city on June 25, 1931, and has grown since World War II by various annexations, such as Sweetsburg in 1964.

The municipality has a current population of over 12,000. The main economy is based on the industrial sector, in particular textiles.  There is also a hospital, Brome-Missisquoi-Perkins, a municipal court, a federal penitentiary, and a Nature Centre close to Davignon Lake.

Cowansville is the seat of the judicial district of Bedford. It is also the birthplace of the artist and botanist Faith Fyles.

Demographics 

Notable people
 George Harold Baker (1877-1916), was a lawyer, political figure, soldier and Member in the Canadian House of Commons, as a Conservative Member of Parliament

See also
List of cities in Quebec

References

External links
 Ville de Cowansville

 
Cities and towns in Quebec